Lilith is a 1964 American drama film written and directed by Robert Rossen. It is based on a novel by J.R. Salamanca and stars Warren Beatty and Jean Seberg.

Plot
Set in a private mental institution, Chestnut Lodge in Rockville, Maryland, the film tells of a trainee occupational therapist, a troubled ex-soldier named Vincent Bruce (Beatty), who becomes dangerously obsessed with seductive, artistic, schizophrenic patient Lilith Arthur (Seberg).

Bruce is successful in helping Lilith emerge from seclusion and leave the institutional grounds for a day in the country, and later escorts her on excursions in which she is alone with him. She attempts to seduce him, and eventually Bruce tells Lilith he is in love with her, after which they begin sleeping together. He catches Lilith seducing an older female patient and witnesses her behaving inappropriately with young boys on two of her outings, incidents which greatly disturb Bruce.

Bruce triggers the suicide of another patient (Fonda) out of jealousy over the patient's crush on Lilith. This brings up memories in Lilith of her brother's suicide, which she implies was due to her attempt to initiate an incestuous relationship with him. She goes on a destructive rampage in her room and winds up in a catatonic state. Bruce then presents himself to his superiors for psychiatric help.

Production
Chestnut Lodge would not permit filming on location so those scenes were done in a vacant mansion rented by the production company, Centur Productions, on the North Shore of Long Island (Locust Valley). Location shooting in Maryland was done in a private home in Rockville as well as in the downtown area, plus scenes at Great Falls on both the Maryland and Virginia sides of the Potomac River, as well as a staged carnival scene at Barnesville, Maryland. This was Rossen's last film.

Preservation
The Academy Film Archive preserved Lilith in 2000.

Cast
 Warren Beatty as Vincent Bruce
 Jean Seberg as Lilith Arthur
 Peter Fonda as Stephen Evshevsky
 Kim Hunter as Dr. Bea Brice
 Anne Meacham as Mrs. Yvonne Meaghan
 Jessica Walter as Laura
 Gene Hackman as Norman
 James Patterson as Dr. Lavrier
 Robert Reilly as Bob Clayfield

Reputation
In The New Biographical Dictionary of Film, David Thomson describes Lilith as "an oddity, the only one of [Rossen's] films that seems passionate, mysterious and truly personal. The other films will look increasingly dated and self-contained, but Lilith may grow."

Accolades
The film was nominated for the American Film Institute's 2002 list AFI's 100 Years...100 Passions.

Jean Seberg was nominated for Best Actress—Drama Golden Globe award by the Hollywood Foreign Press Association.

See also
List of American films of 1964

References

External links

1964 films
1964 drama films
American black-and-white films
American drama films
Columbia Pictures films
1960s English-language films
Films based on American novels
Films directed by Robert Rossen
Films scored by Kenyon Hopkins
Films set in psychiatric hospitals
Films with screenplays by Robert Rossen
1960s American films